Noah Montheo Awassi (born 10 March 1998) is a German professional footballer who plays as a centre-back for FSV Frankfurt.

Club career
On 3 February 2022, Awassi signed with Dornbirn in Austria.

References

External links
 
 
 

1998 births
Living people
Footballers from Dresden
German footballers
Beninese footballers
German people of Beninese descent
Association football central defenders
Dynamo Dresden players
FSV Union Fürstenwalde players
Sportfreunde Lotte players
SV Babelsberg 03 players
FC Schalke 04 II players
R.E. Virton players
FC Dornbirn 1913 players
FSV Frankfurt players
3. Liga players
Regionalliga players
Challenger Pro League players
2. Liga (Austria) players
German expatriate footballers
Expatriate footballers in Belgium
German expatriate sportspeople in Belgium
Expatriate footballers in Austria
German expatriate sportspeople in Austria